The mayor of Westland officiates over the Westland District of New Zealand's South Island. It has been administered by Westland District Council since 1989. The current mayor is Helen Lash, who was elected in 2022.

List of mayors

References

Westland
 Mayor of Westland
Westland District
Mayors of places in the West Coast, New Zealand